Carabus albrechti hagai is a subspecies of ground beetle in the family Carabidae that is endemic to Japan.

References

albrechti hagai
Beetles described in 1997
Endemic fauna of Japan